Ruslan Serhiyovych Kisil (born 23 October 1991) is a Ukrainian professional footballer who plays for Sliema Wanderers as a midfielder.

Career
Kisil was born in the Donetsk Oblast and went to the youth academy of his local club FC Olimpik Donetsk and than on to Shakhtar Donetsk. Upon completion of the school, Kisil was promoted first to Shakhtar-3 Donetsk of the Ukrainian Second League, followed by the Shakhtar reserves, where he would spend two seasons. And in summer of 2012 he signed a contract with FC Illichivets.

References

External links 
 
 

1991 births
Living people
Sportspeople from Donetsk Oblast
Ukrainian footballers
Ukrainian expatriate footballers
Association football midfielders
FC Shakhtar-3 Donetsk players
FC Mariupol players
FC Desna Chernihiv players
FC Olimpik Donetsk players
FC Kolos Kovalivka players
Sliema Wanderers F.C. players
Ukrainian Premier League players
Ukrainian First League players
Ukrainian Second League players
Russian First League players
Maltese Premier League players
Expatriate footballers in Russia
Expatriate footballers in Lithuania
Expatriate footballers in Malta
Ukrainian expatriate sportspeople in Russia
Ukrainian expatriate sportspeople in Lithuania
Ukrainian expatriate sportspeople in Malta
FC Baltika Kaliningrad players